As the capital of Wales, media in Cardiff plays a large role in the city and nationwide. Employment in the sector has grown significantly in recent years, and currently provides employment for 2.1% of the city's workforce – higher than the level across Wales (1.1%) and marginally lower than that across Great Britain as a whole (2.2%).

History

 
At 5pm on 13 February 1923, 5WA Cardiff, a forerunner of BBC Radio Wales, first broadcast from a music shop at 19 Castle Street in Cardiff city centre. Later that evening at 9.30pm Mostyn Thomas, sang Dafydd y Garreg Wen, which was the first Welsh language song to be broadcast. A commemorative plaque records the event. 5WA Cardiff was a radio service which began broadcasting on 13 February 1923 and ended on 27 May 1933.

Press

Cardiff's daily tabloid newspaper is the South Wales Echo, founded in 1884 and formerly based in Thomson House, now in 6 Park Street in the city centre. There are two daily editions – News Extra in the morning and City Final edition. The Weekend Edition is published on Saturday. Roughly 50,000 copies are sold daily. The national newspapers, the Western Mail and Wales on Sunday, are also based in Thomson House as all are owned by Trinity Mirror. The Western Mail has a daily circulation of about 40,000.

The Cardiff edition of Metro is available daily on public transport in the city and around South Wales. Both the South Wales Echo and Metro publish daily information for the city such as the weather and entertainment listings.

The Times Educational Supplement Cymru is based in the city, but the paper itself is printed in England.

Gair Rhydd is the award-winning weekly broadsheet published by the students of Cardiff University and is available free in the Cardiff University Students' Union.

Cardiff County Council publishes the monthly Capital Times, and the Echo Extra is delivered free to homes. The Welsh language newspaper Y Dinesydd (or Papur Bro) is published monthly for the city. Additionally, all British daily newspapers are widely available in the city.

Magazines based in the capital include Jazz UK, Buzz magazine and Primary Times

Television
All of Wales' national broadcasters are based in Cardiff. BBC Cymru Wales used to have its headquarters at, the now largely demolished, Broadcasting House in Llandaff while ITV Cymru Wales is based near the Senedd in Cardiff Bay and the Welsh language broadcaster S4C broadcasts from Llanishen.

In addition, a local television channel for the city, Made in Cardiff, is based in offices at St Mary's Street in the city centre. An analogue local TV channel, Capital TV, broadcast as a low-power RSL analogue station from 2002 to 2009.

The city also has its own Ofcom-licensed local digital television spectrum, owned by Cube Interactive.

Radio

As the national broadcaster, BBC Cymru Wales, used to broadcast BBC Radio Wales (103.9 FM) and Radio Cymru (96.8 FM) on various frequencies across Wales from Broadcasting House in Llandaff.

Cardiff's principal commercial radio stations are Capital South Wales (103.2 FM), Heart South Wales (105.4 FM) and Smooth Wales (1359 AM); all three of which originate local programming from studios at the Red Dragon Centre in Cardiff Bay.

Radio Cardiff (98.7 FM) is a community station based in the Butetown area and Radio Glamorgan broadcasts to the University Hospital of Wales in Heath.

Student radio station Tequila Radio broadcasts from the University of South Wales's ATRiuM Campus and Xpress Radio originates from Cardiff University Students' Union.

Other institutions
The Cardiff School of Journalism, Media and Cultural Studies is based at Cardiff University.
The Atrium building houses most of the Cardiff School of Creative and Cultural Industries faculty (CCI for short) of the University of South Wales.

Use in media

Cardiff is the filming location and/or setting for many mainstream television programmes such as Doctor Who and its spin-offs, Torchwood and  The Sarah Jane Adventures, Class (2016 TV series), Merlin (TV series), Gavin & Stacey, The Story of Tracy Beaker (TV series), His Dark Materials (TV series), Netflix's Sex Education (TV series), Caerdydd and Pobl y Cwm, and for films such as Human Traffic, The Englishman Who Went Up a Hill But Came Down a Mountain, Infinite (film) and 28 Weeks Later. It is also referenced in Mars Attacks!

It was announced on 15 October 2008 that the BBC is to move the filming shows such as Casualty and Crimewatch to studios in Cardiff.
and confirmed on 27 March 2009 that filming would be begin in 2011.

In 2010, Cardiff was used for filming of a contemporary update of Arthur Conan Doyle's Sherlock Holmes in Sherlock, and for a remake of Upstairs, Downstairs.

In 2012, Cardiff was the filming location of new MTV reality show The Valleys. The reality caused controversy and Welsh viewers were angered with the way the Welsh were stereotyped. The reality show takes young hopefuls from The Valleys and move them to Cardiff to pursue their dream careers. The show also shows the cast binge drinking, fighting, having casual sex and revealing themselves.

The BBC 2 quiz Only Connect is produced in Cardiff.

See also
BBC Wales Drama Village
Cardiff
Wales
Media in Wales
BBC Wales headquarters building

References

External links
Capital TV 
Capital TV information

Mass media in Wales
Cardiff